Ingeniero Jacobacci Airport , also known as Capitán FAA H. R. Bordón Airport, is an airport serving Ingeniero Jacobacci, a town in the Río Negro Province of Argentina. The airport is on a low mesa above the town, which is in a wide, dry river channel.

See also

Transport in Argentina
List of airports in Argentina

References

External links
OpenStreetMap - Aeropuerto Cabo Bordón
FallingRain - C FAA H R Borden Airport
OurAirports - Cabo F.A.A. H. R. Bordón Airport

Airports in Argentina